The Nigerian presidential line of succession is the set order of Nigerian government officials who may become or act as President of Nigeria if the incumbent president becomes incapacitated, dies, resigns, or is removed from office (by impeachment).

The line of succession is set out in the Nigerian Constitution and follows the order of the Vice President and Senate President. In May 2010, the death of President Umaru Musa Yar'Adua triggered the succession order, leading to the appointment of his Vice as President of the Federal Republic of Nigeria.

Vice President
President of the Senate
Speaker of the House of Representatives
Chief Justice
Deputy President of the Senate
Deputy Speaker of the House of Representatives

References

Government of Nigeria